Onuškis Manor is a former residential manor in Onuškis village, Rokiškis district. The manor was heavily damaged during World War I and currently only ruins remains.

References

Classicism architecture in Lithuania
Manor houses in Lithuania
Towns in Vilnius County